Salix myrsinites is a species of flowering plant belonging to the family Salicaceae.

Its native range is Northern and Northeastern Europe.

References

myrsinites